Mark Soosaar (officially Mark-Toomas Soosaar; born 12 January 1946 in Viljandi) is an Estonian film director, cinematographer, screenwriter and politician. He has been member of X and XI Riigikogu.

Soosaar graduated from the All-Union State Institute of Cinematography in 1970. He worked for Eesti Televisioon from 1970 until 1978 and Tallinnfilm from 1978 until in 1991 as a director and cinematographer before moving to Pärnu and founding his own film studio, Weiko Saawa Film. He is the director of Museum of New Art, as well the founder chairman of the Kihnu Cultural Institute .

He is a member of Estonian Social Democratic Party.

References

1946 births
Living people
Estonian film directors
Estonian screenwriters
Estonian cinematographers
Social Democratic Party (Estonia) politicians
Members of the Riigikogu, 2003–2007
Members of the Riigikogu, 2007–2011
Recipients of the Order of the White Star, 4th Class
People from Viljandi
Members of the Riigikogu, 2015–2019